Robert Anthony Maxwell Reid is a British auto racing driver, born on 17 May 1957 in Glasgow, Scotland. He was educated at Loretto School in Edinburgh. He lives in England.

Formula cars
He spent many years in Formula Three and other junior single-seater championships, winning the Japanese Formula Three Championship in 1992 and winning Japanese GT championship races, but his success has mostly been with a roof over his head, firstly in sportscars and later in Touring car racing.

He received an offer to join the Jordan F1 Team in 1991, but was unable to raise the required £2.5 million sponsorship money after his sponsor, a Japanese property company, went under due to an economic downturn in Japan. The Jordan F1 team instead signed Bertrand Gachot, who in turn after being sentenced to six months in prison was replaced with Michael Schumacher. He still keeps the letter of acceptance in a frame on his wall in his toilet.

Le Mans 

In the 1990 24 Hours of Le Mans, Anthony competed for Porsche, driving the Alpha Racing 962C in Group C1. He came third overall and won in the nonworks car. Again in 1991 he drove the 962C but with Konrad motorsport.

Later in his career, he drove the Lister Storm at the 1996 24 Hours of Le Mans (he also drove for the team at the 1997 Daytona 24 Hours and the Spa round of the 1998 British GT Championship). Racing in the MG Lola in 2001 and 2002, the team achieved pole position in their class however the car was retired due to gearbox problems. In 2005, Reid drove the Scuderia Ecosse Ferrari. In Qualifying, Anthony completed three laps with a best time of 4:13.237 which became the team's best time. The car eventually retired at the hands of Anthony's team mate due to a delaminated tyre, leaving the car stranded on the circuit.

Touring Cars 

Reid enjoyed a successful stint in Japanese touring cars between 1992 and 1996, driving an ex BTCC Vauxhall Cavalier for Team HKS, winning multiple races. He took third place overall in 1994 against the likes of Tom Kristensen, Steve Soper and Joachim Winkelhock. This led to him joining BMS Scuderia Italia, who were running the works Nissan team in Europe. After a promising 1996 season, Reid was picked up by RML who had won the works contract from Nissan to race in 1997 in the British Touring Car Championship alongside David Leslie. The Primera was brand new and needed development, but the speed he showed in this season was translated into consistent results in 1998, when he fought for the title up to the final round, losing out to Sweden's Rickard Rydell. In 1999 he joined Prodrive who had the works Ford contract, to help develop their Mondeo. Again he struggled in his first season while setting up the car. The closest Reid would come to winning the title was in 2000. A collision in the very last round of the season cost him the championship by two points to team-mate Alain Menu.

For 2001 he joined West Surrey Racing (WSR) as they developed an MG ZS, not racing until the end of the season but still finding time to win the final race of the season, although the team was not eligible for points. He drove for the team for the next 3 seasons, although for 2004 MG pulled out and WSR ran the car privately, only finding the funds to run Reid (whose contract was owned by MG rather than WSR) alongside the better-funded Colin Turkington a few days before the season opened. Against all odds this season was the closest he came to winning the title in this car, also winning the Independent's cup ahead of Matt Neal. For 2005 WSR was unable to find the funds for him to race, and his planned racing with MG in Germany was scrapped when the company folded.

Reid later turned to the Argentinian TC2000 series, helping Honda Petrobras to develop their Honda Civic for competition as well as racing it. He won the 200 km de Buenos Aires in 2008 racing with José María 'Pechito' López.

Reid returned to the BTCC for the final three rounds of the 2009 season for WSR, entered under the Team RAC banner. He was entered in a third car alongside regular drivers Turkington and Stephen Jelley in an attempt to bolster Turkington's championship chances.

Reid drove a Chevron GR8 at racing events in the British GT Championship and also Britcar MSA British Endurance championship in 2012 and 2013.

Since 2016 Anthony has competed in the FunCup UK Championship with Iron Maiden sponsored Team Trooper.

Top Gear appearances 

He had appeared in Top Gear series 10 episode 6 driving a nimble Toyota motorhome.
In series 12 episode 5 he raced a single tier bus against other touring car drivers – winning it.

Reid was involved in an attempt to speed up airport transport on Top Gear, driving a catering truck against other various Touring Car colleagues. The race culminated with Reid being the only racing driver left against Hammond, however the vehicle became unbalanced (after Reid ejected his crockery to lose some weight). The truck listed to one side and eventually fell over, allowing Hammond to win.

He appeared again in Series 20, Episode 2 when he drove a Lincoln Town Car stretch limousine in a taxi race. The race ended with the limousine being split in half.

Racing record

24 Hours of Le Mans results

Complete Japanese Touring Car Championship results
(key) (Races in bold indicate pole position) (Races in italics indicate fastest lap)

Complete Japanese Formula 3 results
(key) (Races in bold indicate pole position) (Races in italics indicate fastest lap)

Complete Japanese Formula 3000 results
(key) (Races in bold indicate pole position; races in italics indicate fastest lap)

Complete JGTC results
(key) (Races in bold indicate pole position) (Races in italics indicate fastest lap)

Complete Super Tourenwagen Cup results
(key) (Races in bold indicate pole position) (Races in italics indicate fastest lap)

Complete British Touring Car Championship results
(key) Races in bold indicate pole position (1 point awarded – 1997–2002 all races, 2003–present just for first race) Races in italics indicate fastest lap (1 point awarded – 2000 onwards all races) * signifies that driver lead race for at least one lap (1 point awarded – 1998–2002 just in feature races, 2003–present all races)

† Not eligible for points

Complete 24 Hours of Spa results

Britcar 24 Hour results

Partial British GT results
(key) (Races in bold indicate pole position in class) (Races in italics indicate fastest lap in class)

† Not eligible for points.

References

External links 

 

1957 births
Living people
People educated at Craigflower Preparatory School
People educated at Loretto School, Musselburgh
Scottish racing drivers
Sportspeople from Glasgow
Japanese Formula 3000 Championship drivers
British Formula Three Championship drivers
Japanese Formula 3 Championship drivers
24 Hours of Le Mans drivers
British Touring Car Championship drivers
Japanese Touring Car Championship drivers
TC 2000 Championship drivers
British GT Championship drivers
World Sportscar Championship drivers
24 Hours of Spa drivers
Porsche Carrera Cup GB drivers
24 Hours of Daytona drivers
Britcar drivers
David Price Racing drivers